A House of Industry was a workhouse in Dublin, Ireland which existed from its establishment by an act of parliament in 1703, "for the employment and maintaining the poor thereof." 

From 1729 the House of Industry also incorporated the foundling hospital. 

It was located at the present site of St. James's Hospital, James's Street, and included  of land. The upkeep of this institution was paid for through taxes levied on sedan chairs, hackney coaches and a House Tax applied throughout the city. After the tax was lifted on 5 January 1823, the workhouse was mainly supported through grants from the Irish Parliament.

In 1796 it accommodated more than 1,700 people. Following an Act of the Irish Parliament, responsibility for its management was assumed by seven 'governors', elected annually by, and out of, the members of Dublin Corporation. At about this time, a number of mechanical innovations by Benjamin Thompson were incorporated into the building for improved ventilation, cooking and heating.
It is to be observed, that this institution differs very materially from any poorhouse, or other institution, in Great Britain, both in its object, its government, and its resources. In Ireland, there are no poor laws, or local taxes, for the support of the poor. This institution was provided for the purpose of providing employment, and for the maintenance of the poor of Dublin, and for the punishment of the vagrants and beggars who infested the streets of that city.
Observations of Thomas Bernard 1799 p156

The House of Industry offered housing for beggars, vagabonds, deserted children under the age of eight, and the mentally insane. In 1773, the workhouse was reformed and split into a hospital for the mentally insane, a workhouse for the poor located in, and a foundling hospital to be primarily used for the safety and education of the admitted children. This foundling hospital took in deserted infants in Dublin but owing to abnormally high mortality rates (four out of five) the foundling hospital came under scrutiny and investigation. These investigations found strong evidence of malpractice directly responsible for the death of thousands of children. The House of Commons stopped allowing new admissions to the hospital in 1831.

The workhouse where vagabonds and beggars were sent fell under similar scrutiny. In 1805 Sir John Carr in his Tour of Ireland described the workhouse as "A gloomy abode of mingled want, disease, vice and malady, where lunatics were loaded with heavy chains and fallen women bound and logged". and Parliament believed the House of Industry was a failure and "completely worthless" Described as 'the Dublin Poor House', it was also visited by the French political theorist Alexis de Tocqueville in 1835, during his investigative tour of Ireland. Tocqueville described the conditions of the inmates there as 'the most hideous and disgusting aspect of destitution'. The food provided was soup rendered from left-overs collected in a wheelbarrow from the wealthy.

With the passage of the Irish Poor Law in 1838, the House of Industry on James's Street became the South Dublin Union.

House of Industry, Channel Row 
Another House of Industry was founded in 1773 in Channel Row, modern-day North Brunswick Street, on the north side of the city in what is today called  Grangegorman close to what was later to become the Royal Canal Harbour.

In 1838, with the passage of the Irish Poor Law this then became referred to as the North Dublin Union.

In 1919, the North Dublin union was amalgamated into the South Dublin Workhouse and the old North Dublin buildings were repurposed. It was from then on simply named the Dublin Union.

See also

Irish Poor Laws
Mendicity Institution
House of Industry

References

Sources
Chapter X from Life in old Dublin by James Collins 1913

Irish Poor Laws
18th century in Ireland
19th century in Ireland
1704 establishments in Ireland
Buildings and structures in Dublin (city)
Social history of Ireland